This is a  list of people from Tangier:

People born in Tangier
 Abdullah al-Ghumari – Muslim cleric
 Ibn Battuta – Berber scholar and traveller
 Ralph Benmergui – Canadian TV and radio host at the Canadian Broadcasting Corporation
 Alexandre Rey Colaço – Portuguese pianist
 Karim Debbagh – Moroccan film producer
 Roger Elliott – first British Governor of Gibraltar
 Bibiana Fernández – Spanish actress and model
 Antonio Fuentes – painter described as the 'Picasso of Tangier'
 Sanaa Hamri – Moroccan music video director
 Emmanuel Hocquard – French poet
 Jean-Luc Mélenchon – French politician, currently MEP
 Alexander Spotswood – American Lieutenant-Colonel and Lieutenant Governor of Virginia
 Heinz Tietjen – German music composer
 Abderrahmane Youssoufi – former Prime Minister of Morocco

People who settled or sojourned in Tangier
 Lancelot Addison –  English chaplain and the author of West Barbary, or a Short Narrative of the Revolutions of the Kingdoms of Fex and Morocco (1671)
 José Luis Alcaine – Spanish-born cinematographer
 William Bayer – American crime fiction writer, author of the novel Tangier
 Bill Bird –  American journalist and the founder of Tangier Gazette
 Jane Bowles –  American writer; wife of Paul Bowles
 Paul Bowles –  American writer and composer; lived in Tangier for 52 years and died there
 Claudio Bravo – painter
 William S. Burroughs – American novelist, essayist, social critic, painter and spoken word performer; lived in Tangier four years
 Truman Capote –  American novelist and writer, who visited Tangier
 João de Castro –  Portuguese naval officer and fourth viceroy of the Portuguese Indies
 Ira Cohen –  American poet, publisher, photographer and filmmaker;  published one issue of a magazine called Gnaoua
 Eugène Delacroix – French Romantic painter
 Jim Ede –  English art collector
 Malcolm Forbes –  publisher of Forbes magazine
 Sean Gullette –  American actor and writer
 Brion Gysin –  English writer and painter
 Mohamed Hamri – Moroccan painter, described as the 'Picasso of Morocco'
 Friedrich von Holstein – German statesman
 Barbara Hutton – wealthy American socialite dubbed by the media as the "Poor Little Rich Girl" because of her troubled life, lived in Tangier during the summer months from 1947 to 1975
 Gavin Lambert –  American (British-born) biographer, novelist and Hollywood screenwriter(and close friend of Paul Bowles), who lived 15 years in Tangier
 Bernard-Henri Lévy – French journalist and intellectual
 Henri Matisse –  French painter
 Joseph McPhillips III –  American theater director and the headmaster of The American School of Tangier; died in Tangier
 Mohamed Mrabet – Moroccan storyteller
 Joe Orton – British playwright
 Ion Perdicaris – US-Greek playboy who was the centre of the Perdicaris incident, a kidnapping that aroused international conflict in 1904
 George John Pinwell –  English painter
 Edward Reichmann – Austro-Hungarian and Canadian businessman
 Reichmann family (including Edward) – rich immigrant Jewish family from Austro-Hungary and Canada
 David Roberts – Scottish painter
 Yves Saint-Laurent – French fashion designer
 J. Slauerhoff – Dutch poet and novelist
 Kenneth Williams – British humourist
 Paula Wolfert – American food writer, author of two Moroccan cookbooks, lived in Tangier for eight years

People who died in Tangier
 Abdullah al-Ghumari – Muslim cleric
 Ibn Battuta – 14th-century traveller and diarist; born in Tangier in 1304 and is said to have been buried there in 1368
 Paul Bowles – expatriate American writer and composer
 Mohamed Choukri – Moroccan novelist; died in Rabat, buried in the Marshan, Tangier
 George Elliott – probably the illegitimate son of Richard Eliot; Chirurgeon to the Earl of Teviot's Regiment at Tangier
 George Fleetwood – one of the regicides of Charles I; brought to trial and sentenced to imprisonment in the Tower of London; may have been transported to Tangier
 Paul Lukas – Hungarian actor
 Joseph McPhillips III – American theater director and headmaster of the American School of Tangier
 John Middleton, 1st Earl of Middleton – commander-in-chief of the troops in Scotland under the reign of Charles II

References

People from Tangier
Tangier